The 1979–80 BYU Cougars men's basketball team represented Brigham Young University in the 1979–80 college basketball season. This was head coach Frank Arnold's 5th season at BYU. The Cougars finished the regular season with a record of 24–5, 13–1 in the Western Athletic Conference. The team's sole conference loss was by a 66–71 score against Clemson in the NCAA Tournament.

Junior Guard Danny Ainge was leading scorer, averaging 19.1 points per game. Center Alan Taylor with 12.5 rebounds per game.

Roster

Schedule

|-
!colspan=9 style=| Regular Season

|-
!colspan=12 style=|NCAA Tournament

References 

BYU Cougars men's basketball seasons
Byu
1979 in sports in Utah
1980 in sports in Utah